Hibiscus Coast Local Municipality was a local municipality in the province of KwaZulu-Natal in South Africa. It governed the Hibiscus Coast on the KwaZulu-Natal South Coast which attracts tourists from the province and other provinces as well as international tourists.

After municipal elections on 3 August 2016 it was merged into the larger Ray Nkonyeni Local Municipality.

Beaches are to be found along the entire seaboard.  Hibberdene Beach, Ramsgate Beach, Marina Beach/San Lameer, and Lucien Beach have been recognized as Blue Flag beaches. The climate of the coastal areas is humid and subtropical — comparable to southern Florida in the United States, but not quite as hot and rainy in the summer.

The coastline is dotted with small towns, many of which serve as seasonal recreational hubs, such as Port Shepstone, Umtamvuna / Port Edward, Margate, Hibberdene and Impenjati / Southbroom.  These towns feature a wide range of tourist-oriented businesses, including restaurants, bars, clubs, movie houses, golf courses, clothing shops, museums, and various types of accommodations.  The income from these businesses has economically benefited the municipality as a whole.

Other economic activities include fishing, agriculture, crafts, and bead works.

The hilly inland regions of the municipality are largely under the ownership of tribal authorities.  Such "traditional" settlements include KwaXolo, KwaNzimakwe, KwaNdwalane, KwaMadlala, KwaMavundla and KwaLushaba.

Main places
The 2001 census divided the municipality into the following main places:

Politics 
The municipal council consisted of fifty-eight members elected by mixed-member proportional representation. Twenty-nine councillors were elected by first-past-the-post voting in twenty-nine wards, while the remaining twenty-nine were chosen from party lists so that the total number of party representatives was proportional to the number of votes received. In the election of 18 May 2011 the African National Congress (ANC) won a majority of forty-one seats on the council.
The following table shows the results of the election.

References

External links
 Official website

KwaZulu-Natal South Coast
Former local municipalities of South Africa
Local municipalities of the Ugu District Municipality